Yebu (language name: Yiin Yebu; also known as Awak or Awok) is one of the Savanna languages of Kaltungo LGA in Gombe State, northeastern Nigeria.

There are five distinct dialects corresponding to each of the original five settlements that had been spoken on the Awak Hill. Yebu is currently spoken in the plains rather than in the speakers' ancestral territory of Awak Hill.

Villages
Yebu villages according to Blench (2019):

Fulani villages that have Yebu chiefs are Tɔrɛ, Langgarɛ, and Lugayidi.

Hausa villages that have Yebu chiefs are Daura, Dundaye, Salifawa, Dogon Ruwa (mixed Hausa and Yebu village), Garin Bako, Garin Korau, and Garin Barau.

Other languages spoken in the area are Waja, Kamo, Tangale, and Tula.

Phonology
Yebu exhibits vowel length contrast, although it is uncommon in the language. It also has consonant gemination. There are six phonetic tones derived from three phonetic tone heights:

High ʹ
Mid ˉ
Low ˋ
Rising Low-High ˇ
Rising Mid-High ᷄
Falling High-Low ˆ

Grammar
Future/irrealis is marked using reduplication. In the region, morphological reduplication used for such purposes is typologically rare.

References

Waja languages
Languages of Nigeria